Ibrahim Issah (born 25 December 2000) is a Ghanaian professional footballer who plays as a midfielder for Ghanaian Premier League side Dreams F.C.

Career

Early career 
Issah started youth career with Royal Awudu Issaka Academy, the academy of former Ghana international Awudu Issaka before securing a move to Dreams FC in 2018.

Dreams FC 
On 19 May 2018, Issah was signed by Ghana Premier League side Dreams FC ahead of the second round of the 2018 Ghanaian Premier League season. He joined the club on a free transfer, signing a four-and-half year deal after passing his mandatory medicals. He made his debut on 23 May 2018, coming on a 64th minute substitute for Samuel Alabi Borquaye in a 1–0 victory over Eleven Wonders. He made 2 league matches before the league was abandoned due to the dissolution of the GFA in June 2018, as a result of the Anas Number 12 Expose.

He scored his debut goal during the 2019 GFA Normalization Committee Special Competition, on 8 May 2019 in a 3–1 loss to Dreams FC. He scored the consolation goal for his team in the 90th minute. On 25 May 2019, he scored the only goal to help Dreams FC secure a victory over Accra Hearts of Oak. He ended the competition with 13 matches and 2 goals. During the 2019–20 Ghana Premier League season, he played 14 matches and scored 3 goals before the league was truncated due to the COVID-19 pandemic.

Ahead of the 2020–21 Ghana Premier League season, he was named on the team's squad list as the league was set to restart. On 3 February 2021, Issah scored a brace in a 3–0 victory over West African Football Academy (WAFA). He was adjudged the man of the match at the end of the match.

References

External links 

Living people
2000 births
Association football midfielders
Ghanaian footballers
Dreams F.C. (Ghana) players
Ghana Premier League players